The 2023 Campeonato Capixaba (officially the Capixabão BANESTES 2023 for sponsorship reasons) is the 107th edition of Espírito Santo's top professional football league organized by FES. The competition began on January 19 and will end on April 23.

Participating teams

First stage

Final stage

Bracket

Quarter-finals

|}

References 

Campeonato Capixaba seasons
Capixabão
2023 in Brazilian football